Serafimovich is a town and the administrative center of Serafimovichsky District in Volgograd Oblast, Russia, located on the right bank of the River Don,  northwest of Volgograd, the administrative center of the oblast. Population:

History
It was founded in 1589 as the stanitsa of Ust-Medveditskaya. In 1933, it was granted town status and renamed Serafimovich after the writer Alexander Serafimovich, who was born and lived here.

Administrative and municipal status
Within the framework of administrative divisions, Serafimovich serves as the administrative center of Serafimovichsky District. As an administrative division, it is incorporated within Serafimovichsky District as the town of district significance of Serafimovich. As a municipal division, the town of district significance of Serafimovich is incorporated within Serafimovichsky Municipal District as Serafimovich Urban Settlement.

References

Notes

Sources

Cities and towns in Volgograd Oblast
Don Host Oblast
Populated places established in 1589